Hiraki (written:  or ) is a Japanese surname. Notable people with the surname include:

, Japanese politician
, Japanese sport wrestler
, Japanese table tennis player
, Japanese footballer and manager
, Japanese footballer

See also
Hiraki Station, a railway station in Miyama, Fukuoka Prefecture, Japan

Japanese-language surnames